Linda Perhacs (born 1943) is an American psychedelic folk singer, who released her first album, Parallelograms, in 1970 to scant notice or sales. The album was rediscovered by record enthusiasts and reissued numerous times beginning in 1998, growing in popularity with the rise of the New Weird America movement and the Internet. In 2014, she released a second album titled The Soul of All Natural Things, and a third, I'm a Harmony, in 2017.

Biography
Perhacs was born Linda Arnold in 1943 in Mill Valley, California. In the late 1960s, Perhacs relocated to Topanga Canyon, and was working as a dental hygienist in Beverly Hills, California under a former professor she had met while a student at the University of Southern California. In her spare time, she wrote songs. One of her dental clients, Oscar-winning film composer Leonard Rosenman, was impressed by one of her demos and brought her into a studio during 1969–1970, producing her first album, Parallelograms. When the album failed to make an impression, she returned to her dental career.

Michael Piper of folk label the Wild Places, who had first reissued the album in 1998 sourced from the LP, located and contacted Perhacs in 2000, leading to expanded reissues of Parallelograms on CD and vinyl in 2003, sourced from tapes in Perhacs' personal collection. It was reissued again by Sunbeam Records in 2008, by both Mexican Summer and Sundazed Records in 2010, and by Anthology Recordings in 2014.

Following her rediscovery and the reissues, Perhacs returned to recording, and recorded her second album in 2012 and 2013 with producers Chris Price and Fernando Perdomo and collaborators including Julia Holter and Ramona Gonzalez of Nite Jewel. The Soul of All Natural Things was released on March 4, 2014 by Asthmatic Kitty Records. 
    
Her songs have been prominently sampled, including "Chimacum Rain" (by Prefuse 73 for the track "Rain Edit (Interlude)" from the 2005 album Surrounded by Silence, and by Jadakiss for his song "Rain", released on his 2015 "Top 5 Dead or Alive" album) and "Hey, Who Really Cares" (by UK rap artist Lowkey in his song "Who Really Cares", from his 2009 compilation album Uncensored). In 2007, her song "If You Were My Man" was featured on the soundtrack for the film Daft Punk's Electroma. An interview she did with BBC in 2005 was also sampled for bloodbath64's song "Beautiful Horses".

Perhacs has made several guest appearances on other recordings. She sang backing vocals on "Freely" from Devendra Banhart's Smokey Rolls Down Thunder Canyon (2007), and sang on and cowrote the song "You Wash My Soul" on Mark Pritchard's album Under the Sun (2016).

In March 2016, Perhacs released a new single, "The Dancer", as a preview for her third album.

In May 2016, her song "River of God" (from The Soul of All Natural Things) was selected by Land's End for use in a commercial for their Lands' End Canvas line.

Perhacs' third album, I'm a Harmony, was released September 22, 2017 on Omnivore Recordings. Co-produced by Perhacs, Perdomo and Pat Sansone (of Wilco and the Autumn Defense), it features collaborations with artists including Banhart, Pritchard, Holter, Nels Cline and Durga McBroom.

Discography

Studio albums
Parallelograms (1970, Kapp Records)
The Soul of All Natural Things (2014, Asthmatic Kitty Records)
I'm a Harmony (2017, Omnivore Recordings)

Singles
"Children" promo CD single (2014, Asthmatic Kitty Records)
"The Dancer" digital single (2016, self-released)

References

External links

Official site
Review by Aaron Milenski
Oct 2009 Interview with Daiana Feuer
Arcane Candy gallery and review of Linda's first-ever live show
The Dental Hygienist Who Wrote Music History. An interview with Linda Perhacs Video by Louisiana Channel
February 23, 2014 interview on NPR's Morning Edition

1943 births
American folk musicians
American women singer-songwriters
Living people
Asthmatic Kitty artists
Kapp Records artists
Omnivore Recordings artists
Singer-songwriters from California
University of Southern California alumni
21st-century American women